Rear Admiral André Jubelin (28 July 1906, Toulon – 7 May 1986, Sanary-sur-mer) was a French naval aviator who served with distinction in the French navy and the Fleet Air Arm during World War II.  He was a pioneer of aircraft carrier operations, and after the war commanded the French aircraft carrier Arromanches.

Sources, notes

Bibliography
 Jubelin, A.: The Flying Sailor, London: Hurst & Blackett (1953). First published in France as Marin de Métier – Pilote de Fortune, Éditions France-Empire (1951).

French military personnel of World War II
Fleet Air Arm aviators
French Navy admirals
Recipients of the Resistance Medal
Grand Croix of the Légion d'honneur
Military personnel from Toulon
1906 births
1986 deaths
Fleet Air Arm personnel of World War II